Kolunić is a village in the municipality of Bosanski Petrovac, Bosnia and Herzegovina.

One of the oldest families originally from the village of Kolunić is the family Mirković. Petar Mirković (1855-1935), a famous teacher and writer, was born in Kolunić.

Demographics 
According to the 2013 census, its population was 232.

References

Populated places in Bosanski Petrovac
Serb communities in the Federation of Bosnia and Herzegovina